Mordellistena festiva is a species of beetle in the family Mordellidae. It was described in 1891 by George Charles Champion and is endemic to Hungary.

References

festiva
Beetles described in 1891
Endemic fauna of Hungary
Beetles of Europe